The 486th Flight Test Squadron is a secretive United States Air Force unit with a misleading designation, assigned to Eglin Air Force Base, Florida, which is associated with activities of the U.S. State Department Foreign Emergency Support Team and Central Intelligence Agency Special Activities Center. The squadron motto is "Non semper ea sunt quae videntur" which translates as "Not always what they seem". It is currently assigned to the 96th Test Wing, and operates a pair of Boeing C-32B Gatekeeper aircraft, on stand-by alert for special operations and intelligence missions world-wide. Official documents make it clear that operations fall under the aegis of Air Force Special Operations Command. Of the two C-32B craft in existence, the 486th appears to fly the more clandestine craft, or on more clandestine missions, as the other operator of the C-32B, the 150th Special Operations Squadron of the New Jersey Air National Guard, denies the existence of a second aircraft and makes no mention of the 486th in public or internal documentation.

Operations
The 486th Flight Test Squadron was activated by 1995. One former employee describes it as a "classified unit" and "a selectively manned, one-of-a-kind unit." Very little is officially acknowledged about the classified missions of the 486th FLTS, which is, in fact, not a test unit at all, but a quick-reaction transportation operation utilized by the Federal Emergency Management Agency, the Domestic Emergency Support Team, and the Foreign Emergency Support Team to respond to terrorist incidents worldwide. The aircraft may also be utilized in conjunction with the Special Activities Division of the Central Intelligence Agency.

The test unit designation was probably selected to blend in with the type of operations that are conducted regularly at Eglin AFB by Air Force Materiel Command whose mission is the development, acquisition, testing, deployment and sustainment of all air-delivered non-nuclear weapons. The vast Eglin complex is also home to the headquarters of Air Force Special Operations Command at Hurlburt Field, as well as the United States Army's 7th Special Forces Group, which relocated from Fort Bragg, North Carolina, in 2011.

Equipment

 Boeing C-32B Gatekeeper – 2

See also
 List of United States Air Force test squadrons
 Foreign Emergency Support Team
 Special Activities Division

References

Military units and formations in Florida
Flight test squadrons of the United States Air Force